Alecia McKenzie (born Kingston, Jamaica) is a Jamaican writer and journalist.

Life
She studied at Alpha Academy in Kingston, Troy University in Alabama, and Columbia University in New York, focusing on languages, art and journalism. At Troy University, she was the first Jamaican editor of the student newspaper, The Tropolitan, and graduated summa cum laude.

She has worked for various international news organizations and has taught Communications at the Vrije Universiteit Brussel. Besides Jamaica, she has lived in the United States, Belgium, England and Singapore and now mainly shares her time between France, where she is based with her family, and the Caribbean.

Writing career
Her first collection of short stories, Satellite City, won the regional Commonwealth Writers Prize for Best First Book (Canada and the Caribbean). Her second book, When the Rain Stopped in Natland, is a novella for young readers, and has been included on the literacy program in several schools.

That was followed by a novella for teenagers, Doctor’s Orders, which is a part-adventure, part-detective story, with mostly teenage characters, set in the Caribbean; and a second collection of stories, Stories From Yard, first published in its Italian translation. Her fifth book, Sweetheart, a novel, was on 21 May 2012 announced as the Caribbean regional winner of the Commonwealth Book Prize 2012. The French translation of Sweetheart (Trésor) won the Prix Carbet des lycéens in 2017.

In 2020, her novel A Million Aunties was published in the Caribbean and North America.

McKenzie's stories have appeared in the following anthologies, among others: The Oxford Book of Caribbean Short Stories, Global Tales, Light Transports, Girls' Night In, Stories from Blue Latitudes, The Penguin Book of Caribbean Short Stories, Bridges: A Global Anthology of Short Stories, Crises, Risks and New Regionalisms in Europe  and Rómanska Ameríka (Icelandic). Literary magazines and sites that have carried her short fiction include The Malahat Review and Culture (French).

Her poetry has also been published in the Journal of Postcolonial Writing, the Journal of Caribbean Literatures, Leggere Donna, The Gleaner and other publications.

As a reporter, she has written numerous articles that have appeared in a range of media, including The Guardian, Black Enterprise, The Wall Street Journal Europe, New African, and Chess Life.

Books
Satellite City, Longman, 1992, 
When the Rain Stopped in Natland, Illustrator Guy Parker-Rees, Longman, 1995, 
Doctor’s Orders, Heinemann, 2005, 
Stories from Yard, Peepal Tree Press, 2005, 
Sweetheart, Peepal Tree Press, 2011,

Translations
Schätzchen (Sweetheart), edition pen im Loecker Verlag, Wien, 2020,

Awards and recognition
2017 – Prix Carbet des lycéens Winner for Trésor, the French translation of Sweetheart
2015 – Commonwealth Short Story Prize Shortlist for Cindy's Class
2012 – Commonwealth Book Prize Winner, Caribbean region, for Sweetheart
1993 – Commonwealth Writers' Prize Winner, Best First Book, Canada & the Caribbean, for Satellite City

References

External links
, 

Year of birth missing (living people)
Living people
Jamaican women short story writers
Jamaican short story writers
Jamaican women novelists
20th-century Jamaican novelists
21st-century Jamaican novelists
20th-century Jamaican women writers
People from Kingston, Jamaica
21st-century Jamaican women writers
20th-century short story writers
21st-century short story writers